is a Michelin Guide starred French restaurant in Strasbourg, named after a stuffed crocodile.

History
The restaurant was named after a stuffed crocodile that a local general brought back from overseas whilst on Napoleon Bonaparte's campaign in Egypt and Syria, and which is hung over the foyer. In 1921, the prominent French gastronomic journalist Curnonsky (nicknamed the "Prince of Gastronomy") wrote about Au Crocodile, and the stuffed crocodile in the foyer.

Émile Jung and his wife Monique took over the restaurant in 1971 and, in 1989, it was awarded three Michelin stars. In 2002, it lost one of them. Jung said, "No words can ease the pain that eats at our hearts and that has killed our spirits". Some of Jung's colleagues took out a full-page advertisement to show their support.

The restaurant has been used as a site for discussing international relations: in May 2010 the Prime Minister of Albania Sali Berisha and his opposition leader Edi Rama were summoned to a meeting there by two leading members of the European Parliament. 
Chef Philippe Bohrer purchased the restaurant in 2010 from Jung for more than a million Euros. in 2015 under the new leadership of Cedric Moulot Au Crocodile in Strasbourg was given new life. The chef Franck Pelux and the owner Cedric Moulot are emblematic of the revival of this famed eatery.

 in Vancouver, British Columbia, Canada, was named after  after chef Michel Jacob visited the French restaurant as a young man.

Reception

Travel guide Fodor's described the dishes of chef Bohrer as "dazzling", and thought that the interior was "aglow". The review by fellow travel guide Frommer's also thought favourably of the interior of the restaurant, and described the dishes as "inventive", saying their "major problem comes only when the bill ... arrives".

In 2018 Au Crocodile topped TripAdvisor's list of the World's best restaurants.

References

French restaurants in France
Michelin Guide starred restaurants in France
Restaurants in Strasbourg
Restaurants established in 1971
French companies established in 1971